Gary Goodchild (born 27 January 1958 in Chelmsford) is an English former footballer who played in the Football League for Arsenal, Crystal Palace, Hereford United and Reading.

He currently works as a scout for Wolverhampton Wanderers.

References

External links
 Gary Goodchild stats at Holmesdale.net

English footballers
English Football League players
1958 births
Living people
Arsenal F.C. players
Hereford United F.C. players
Reading F.C. players
Crystal Palace F.C. players
Viking FK players
Kramfors-Alliansen Fotboll players
Bryne FK managers
Viking FK managers
Viking FK non-playing staff
Sportspeople from Chelmsford
Association football forwards
English expatriate footballers
Expatriate footballers in Sweden
English expatriate sportspeople in Sweden
Expatriate footballers in Norway
English expatriate sportspeople in Norway
Expatriate football managers in Norway
English football managers